Gardner Nunatak is a nunatak rising to about ,  west-southwest of Tollefson Nunatak in the Yee Nunataks of Palmer Land, Antarctica. It was mapped by the United States Geological Survey (USGS) from surveys and U.S. Navy aerial photographs, 1961–68, and from Landsat imagery taken 1973–74, and was named in 1987 by the Advisory Committee on Antarctic Names after Robert N. Gardner, a USGS cartographer who participated in surveys at Cape Crozier (Ross Island), South Pole Station, and Palmer Station, 1973–74.

References

Nunataks of Palmer Land